Glacier (styled as GLACIER) is a visual kei rock band from Okinawa, Japan. Makoto, Nao and Aki have been friends since they were elementary schoolchildren. The three members started the band in Okinawa. They released a CD single Nangoku Shōjo from a Japanese record label Crown Records on 23 July 2008.

Biography 
Glacier means a mass of ice on the mountains or rivers. When the band was in Okinawa, they were not conscious of Okinawa at first. So, when they decided on the band name, they chose the thing which is not in Okinawa. But, since they used Okinawan scale, their music style might be categorised as Okinawan music.

After the band moved to Tokyo, they thought that they should open their Okinawan spirits which were hiding inside. They expressed the intention on the lyrics of the title song "Nangoku Shōjo" from the first CD single Nangoku Shōjo. Makoto, who wrote the lyrics, told that he constructed the words for the listeners to remind southern islands because he wanted them to understand easily the band's hometown and feelings. From this way of thinking, the band has begun to widen the Okinawan club pops as the point in their Okinawan entertainment.

The first album Ryūkyū Carmen 80's has been made with atmosphere of Okinawan music, using computer music and adding popular melodies like Kayōkyoku. Nao, who composed many songs in this album, said that these sounds were born naturally from his inside. Not only Okinawan club pops, but also southern islands were also one of the concepts of the album. So, a song "Ryūkyū Carmen", which was conscious of Spanish passionate sound, was recorded in the album. This song was the first to complete while the band were composing the songs for the album.

The band released a CD single SADISTIC LOVE on 17 December 2008. The previous work Ryūkyū Carmen 80's was released by Crown Records, a member of RIAJ, but the single has been released by an indie label this time. The song "Nangoku Shōjo" was one of the songs representative of the band, and it described a bittersweet young love story in Okinawa. As opposed to the song, a tune of SADISTIC LOVE emphasised a taste of House music, it also expressed an old-fashioned and smart atmosphere. They had a time to look back upon the band in 2008. As a result, they reconfirmed their essential mind that they want to be a representative of Okinawa and keep their own spirits as an Okinawan band.

Visual kei music fans have a high affinity for Magazine in Japan. So, though the Japanese publishing industry is in a long slump, it has been keeping a tendency for many years that a strategic publicity of release or concert information about Visual kei artists was announced entirely on specified Visual kei music magazines. Most of publishers, which publish these magazines, are often headquartered in Tokyo. As a necessary result, the capital city was exclusively telegraphing Visual kei information. But since 2009, the band was gradually decreasing a publicity on the magazines, to make up for it, increasing local media in Okinawa, such as FM Okinawa, Okinawa Radio or FM21. They had a one-man concert at Naha, Okinawa, Japan on 14 August 2009. And they were invited to a special stage of a traditional event Tsuna Festa Yonabaru 2009 to perform a short concert at Yonabaru, Okinawa on 15 August.

The band released a CD single Kanasambana as the first work of their own label on 4 November 2009. Naoya Yoshida, who was a guitarist of Valentine D.C., took the post of sound producer on the work. The performance of the special stage at Tsuna Festa Yonabaru 2009 was recorded on a DVD attached to the CD. Love Chuppa, a radio programme of Okinawa Radio, broadcast a thirty-minute special programme featuring this CD Kanasambana and the band without the members' appearance. Not "Made in Japan" but "Made in Okinawa" was printed on the package of the CD Kanasambana. That is, the description shows that the band is conscious of Okinawa further than the past.

Kōjirō, who was a support guitarist until the days before 8 November 2009, has joined to the band as a regular member at the one-man concert on the day.

Kōjirō (guitarist) and Yūki (drummer) left the band on 25 November 2010.

Discography

Single 
 Ryūkyū Renka (11 November 2007 / EXCC-0113)
 Nangoku Shōjo (23 July 2008 / CRCP-10202)
 SADISTIC LOVE (17 December 2008 / XQDT-1010)
 Kanasambana (4 November 2009 / HMCG-10001)
 The Dancing Branches (28 April 2010 / Released as music download)
 Hoshi no Shirushi [Signs upon a star ] (26 May 2010 / Released as music download)
 Ai no Furu Machi [Lovefall Street ] (30 June 2010 / Released as music download)
 Kariyushi [Celebration ] (28 July 2010 / Released as music download)

Album 
 Ryūkyū Carmen 80's (6 August 2008 / CRCP-40212)

Video 
 Tokyo Kanasambana (Weekly release only for Japanese mobile phone)
 Nangoku Shōjo (Released on 24 February 2010)
 Aoi Chura Shima (Released on 3 March 2010)
 SADISTIC LOVE (Released on 10 March 2010)
 Orion no Tegami (Released on 17 March 2010)
 Kiku Saki Beni Ao (Released on 24 March 2010)
 Urizun Biyori - Rainy Days (Released on 31 March 2010)
 Ryūkyū Carmen (Released on 7 April 2010)
 Kugatsu incense (Released on 14 April 2010)
 Rhythmic Interlude (Released on 21 April 2010)
 Doll Parade (Released on 28 April 2010)
 Kariyushi (Released on 12 May 2010)
 Hoshi no Shirushi (Released on 19 May 2010)
 Shima Uta (Released on 26 May 2010)
 Hoshizuna (Released on 2 June 2010)
 Kanasambana (Released on 9 June 2010)
 Diego no Hana ga Saku koro ni (Released on 16 June 2010)
 Taiyō no Kuni (Released on 23 June 2010)

Compilation album 
 Shock Edge 2008 (15 October 2008 / SWCD-2008)

Tie-in

References

External links 
 
 
 Glacier's official website 
 Crown Records 

Japanese rock music groups
Visual kei musical groups
Musical groups from Okinawa Prefecture